Senator McBurney may refer to:

Andrew McBurney (1815–1894), Ohio State Senate
John F. McBurney III (born 1950), Rhode Island State Senate